= European Family Business =

- Abbreviation: EFB
- Formation: 1999
- Founded at: Brussels
- Purpose: Family business associations federation
- Headquarters: Brussels
- Location: Brussels, Belgium
- Region served: EU
- Official language: English
- Website: europeanfamilybusinesses.eu

European Family Business is a private European non-profit organization created in 1999 that acts as a federation of national associations representing long-term family businesses, including small, medium and large enterprises.

Family businesses employ more than 40% of workers in the European Union, excluding the public sector.

== Members ==
- Andorra: Empresa familiar Andorrana
- Belgium: FBN Belgium
- Bulgaria: FBN Bulgaria
- Estonia: Estonian Family Entrepreneurs Association
- Finland: Perheyrysten liitto
- France: FBN France and Mouvement Des Entreprises de Taille Intermédiaire
- Germany: Die Familienunternehmer
- Italy: The Italian Association of Family Businesses (AIdAF)
- Malta: Family Business Office Malta
- Netherlands: FBNed
- Portugal: Associação das Empresa Familiares
- United Kingdom: Institute for Family Business
- Romania: FBN Romania
- Spain: Instituto de la Empresa Familiar
- Sweden: Family Business Network
- Others: The Henokians
